Jay Hyung Lee is a professor at Department of Chemical and Biomolecular Engineering in KAIST (Korea Advanced Institute of Science and Technology). His h-index is 55 according to Google Scholar. Lee was a professor at Georgia Institute of Technology in the United States from 2000 to 2010. Lee is a fellow of Institute of Electrical and Electronics Engineers (IEEE). He is an editor of Computers & Chemical Engineering journal.

References 

Year of birth missing (living people)
Living people
Academic staff of KAIST
South Korean engineers
Chemical engineers
Academic journal editors
Chemical engineering academics